The 2015 Jacksonville Dolphins football team represented Jacksonville University in the 2015 NCAA Division I FCS football season. They were led by ninth-year head coach Kerwin Bell and played their home games at D. B. Milne Field. They were a member of the Pioneer Football League. They finished the season 9–2, 6–2 in PFL play. However, due to PFL rules violations, their official conference record was 0–0 and did not occupy a place in the conference standings.

On December 3, it was announced that head coach Kerwin Bell's contract would not be renewed. He finished at Jacksonville with a nine year record of 66–35.

Schedule

Source: Schedule

References

Jacksonville
Jacksonville Dolphins football seasons
Jacksonville Football